Miguel Teurbe Tolón y de la Guardia  (September 20, 1820 – November 16, 1857) was a Cuban playwright, poet, and the creator of the Coat of arms of Cuba and the Flag of Cuba.

In 1849, Tolón was declared an enemy of Spain and was forced into exile in the United States. 

While in the United States, Tolón was a freemason.

He was married to Emilia Margarita Teurbe Tolón y Otero.

References

External links
 

1820 births
1857 deaths
Cuban male poets
Cuban dramatists and playwrights
Male dramatists and playwrights
19th-century Cuban poets
19th-century dramatists and playwrights
19th-century male writers
Flag designers